This is a list of cities in Antigua and Barbuda, sorted by alphabetical order.

 A city can be defined as an area with over 700 people.
 A town can be defined as an area with 400 to 699 people.
 A village can be defined as an area that is known as a village or has between 100 to 399 people.
 A hamlet can be defined as an area with less than 100 people.

A 

 All Saints, Antigua and Barbuda

B 

 Barbuda-North
 Barbuda-South
 Belmont, Antigua and Barbuda
 Bendals
 Bethesda, Antigua and Barbuda
 Blue Waters, Antigua and Barbuda
 Bolands
 Branns Hamlet
 Buckleys

C 

 Carlisle, Saint George
 Cedar Grove, Antigua and Barbuda
 Cedar Valley, Antigua and Barbuda
 Clare Hall, Antigua and Barbuda
 Cobbs Cross
 Codrington, Antigua and Barbuda
 Collins, Antigua and Barbuda
 Coolidge, Antigua and Barbuda
 Crabs Hill
 Crosbies

D 

 Diamonds, Antigua and Barbuda

E 

 Ebenezer, Antigua and Barbuda
 Emanuel, Antigua and Barbuda
 English Harbour

F 

 Falmouth, Antigua and Barbuda
 Ffryes
 Five Islands, Antigua and Barbuda
 Freemans, Antigua and Barbuda
 Freetown, Antigua and Barbuda

G 

 Glanvilles
 Golden Grove, Antigua and Barbuda
 Gray Hill, Antigua and Barbuda
 Grays Farm
 Greenbay

J 

 Jennings, Antigua and Barbuda
 John Hughes, Antigua and Barbuda
 Johnsons Point
 Jolly Harbour

L 

 Liberta, Antigua and Barbuda

M 

 Marsh Village
 Montpelier, Antigua and Barbuda

N 

 Newfield, Antigua and Barbuda
 Nut Grove, Antigua and Barbuda

O 

 Obeez
 Old Road
 Osbourn, Antigua and Barbuda

P 

 Pares, Antigua and Barbuda
 Parham, Antigua and Barbuda
 Pattersons
 Piggotts
 Potters Village

R 

 Radio Range

S 
 Sawcolts
 Sea View Farm
 Seatons (village)
 St. John's, Antigua and Barbuda
 St. Johnston, Antigua and Barbuda
 St. Philips, Antigua and Barbuda
 Swetes

T 

 Tomlinson, Antigua and Barbuda

U 

 Urlings

V 

 Vernons, Antigua and Barbuda
 Villa, Antigua and Barbuda

W 

 Willikies

Y 

 Yeptons

Largest settlements 

Detailed list of settlements in Antigua and Barbuda by population.

 Saint John's 22,634  
 All Saints 3,412 
 Liberta 2,239 
 Potter's Village 2,067 
 Bolans 1,785
 Swetes 1,573 
 Seaview Farm 1,486 
 Piggotts 1,363 
 Codrington 1,325
 Parham 1,276

Villages 
Five Islands village

See more..
 List of populated places in the Caribbean

Antigua and Barbuda
 
Antigua and Barbuda geography-related lists
Antigua and Barbuda